Hannah Kent (born 1985) is an Australian writer, known for two novels – Burial Rites (2013) and The Good People (2016). Her third novel, Devotion, was published in 2021.

Early life and education
Kent was born in 1985 grew up in the Adelaide Hills of South Australia. She attended Heathfield High School in Heathfield.

She earned a PhD in creative writing at Flinders University, her thesis being the basis of her first novel, Burial Rites.

Career

In 2010, Kent co-founded the Australian literary journal Kill Your Darlings with Rebecca Starford.

In 2011 Kent won the inaugural Writing Australia Unpublished Manuscript Award for her novel Burial Rites. Burial Rites tells the story of Agnes Magnúsdóttir, a servant in northern Iceland who was condemned to death after the murder of two men, one of whom was her employer, and became the last woman put to death in Iceland. Kent was drawn to the idea of writing her story after a visit to the scene of the woman's execution at Þrístapar, close to where she stayed for some time as a Rotary exchange student when she was 18. The novel crafts a more ambiguous, sympathetic image of the life of a woman widely regarded in popular opinion to have been "an inhumane witch, stirring up murder". Burial Rites went on to be translated into thirty languages and in 2017 it was confirmed that Jennifer Lawrence would play the role of Agnes Magnúsdóttir in a film adaptation. A documentary about Kent's experiences in Iceland and writing Burial Rites was aired on the ABC TV as an episode of Australian Story titled "No More Than a Ghost", on 1 July 2013.

Kent's second novel,The Good People, was published in 2016. Set in Ireland's County Kerry in 1825, it is the story of widow's struggle to find a cure for her grandson who has been struck down by a mysterious inability to speak and who is feared by others in this superstitious community as a changeling. The novel takes inspiration from the case of the death of Michael Leahy. It was translated into ten languages and shortlisted for the Walter Scott Award for Historical Fiction (UK) 2017. Aquarius Films will adapt The Good People for screen.

In 2020 it was announced that Elisabeth Moss would star in Kent's screenwriting debut, Run Rabbit Run, and Daina Reid would direct the film. On 2 December 2021, Sarah Snook replaced Moss as the star.

Her third novel, Devotion, set in a fictionalised version of the Adelaide Hills town of Hahndorf, is an historical love story between two young Lutheran women set in the 1830s, "unfurling in a time that doesn't have the language for it". The novel takes place in their Prussian homeland and the new colony of South Australia.

Awards and honours

Burial Rites

 Winner of the Prix Critiqueslibres Decouvrir Étranger 2017
 Winner of the ABIA Literary Fiction Book of the Year 2014
 Winner of the Davitt Awards Best Debut Novel 2014
 Winner of the Davitt Awards Reader's Choice 2014
 Winner of the ABA Nielsen Bookdata Bookseller's Choice Award 2014
 Winner of the Booktopia People's Choice Award 2014
 Winner of the FAW Christina Stead Award 2013
 Winner of the Indie Books Award for Debut Fiction of the Year 2014
 Winner of the Victorian Premier's Literary Awards People's Choice Award 2014
 Winner of the Sydney Morning Herald Best Young Australian Novelist 2014
 Shortlisted for the International IMPAC Dublin Literary Award 2015
 Shortlisted for the Voss Literary Prize 2014
 Shortlisted for the National Book Awards International Author of the Year 2014
 Shortlisted for the Stella Prize 2014
 Shortlisted for the Baileys Women's Prize for Fiction 2014
 Shortlisted for the Victorian Premier's Prize for Fiction 2014
 Shortlisted for the ALS Gold Medal 2014
 Shortlisted for the Guardian First Book Award 2013
 Shortlisted for the NIB Waverley Award for Literature 2013

The Good People
 Shortlisted for the University of Queensland Fiction Book Award 2017
 Shortlisted for the Readings Prize for New Australian Fiction 2017
 Shortlisted for the Walter Scott Award for Historical Fiction (UK) 2017
 Shortlisted for the Indie Books Award for Literary Fiction 2017
 Shortlisted for the ABIA Literary Fiction Book of the Year Award 2017

Devotion 

 Shortlisted for the Indie Books Award for Fiction 2022
 Shortlisted, Prime Minister's Literary Award for fiction 2022

Personal life
 Kent lives in the Adelaide Hills with her wife, Heidi, and their two young children.

References

Further reading
Prejudice melts away in a frigid landscape, Burial Rites review by Michael McGirr, Sydney Morning Herald. 25 May 2013
Burial Rites author Hannah Kent's passion for the past has created a big future, The Age. 8 October 2016

External links 

1985 births
Living people
21st-century Australian novelists
21st-century Australian women writers
Australian women novelists